Gabriel Porras (born Carlos Gabriel Porras Flores, February 13, 1968 in Mexico City, Mexico) is a Mexican actor. He began his acting career working for TV Azteca in telenovelas like "Tres Veces Sofia" along with Mexican diva Lucía Méndez and "El Tio Alberto". His acting career strengthened when he played his first protagonist role in a "El Alma Herida", a telenovela, produced by Telemundo which is owned by NBC Universal. In "El Alma Herida" he shared credits along with Mexican actress Itatí Cantoral with whom he had a relationship in real life. In 2021 he co-founded, along with Vanessa Apolito, Ulcitoecoco Films a production company, to produce movies in Dominican Republic.

Personal life 
Gabriel Porras married American-born actress Sonya Smith (his co-star in the telenovela Olvidarte Jamas) popular in Venezuelan television drama on February 29, 2008. They announced their divorce on June 24, 2013.

Filmography

Film

Television roles

Awards and nominations

References

External links 
 Gabriel Porras Biography
https://notaclave.com/gabriel-porras-y-vanessa-apolito-lanzan-ulcitoecoco-films-en-rd/
 Telemundo Website
 

1968 births
Living people
Male actors from Mexico City
Mexican emigrants to the United States
Mexican male film actors
Mexican male telenovela actors
American male film actors
American male telenovela actors